Oliver Atkins (born 12 August 1988 in Hobart, Australia) is a rugby union footballer. His regular playing position is lock.

He previously played for Aviva Premiership side Exeter, when he left  Edinburgh in the summer of 2015.

He was named in the Waratahs squad for the 2013 Super Rugby season. Atkins previously made two appearances for the Western Force during the 2012 Super Rugby season.

Atkins left Exeter Chiefs after four years to join French side Rouen in the Pro D2 for the 2019-20 season. Afterwards, he returned to his home nation in Australia to rejoin Western Force for the 2020 Super Rugby AU season. 

On 13 November 2020, Atkins returns to England back in the Premiership Rugby with Gloucester from the 2020-21 season.

Reference List 

1988 births
Living people
Australian expatriate sportspeople in England
Australian rugby union players
Edinburgh Rugby players
New South Wales Waratahs players
Rugby union locks
Rugby union players from Hobart
Scotland 'A' international rugby union players
Western Force players
Exeter Chiefs players
Rouen Normandie Rugby players
Gloucester Rugby players